La Lime is a surname. Notable people with the surname include:

 Helen La Lime (born 1951), American diplomat
 Jean La Lime (died 1812), trader from Quebec and was called the "first murder in Chicago"